Baby Clothes is a 1926 American short silent comedy film directed by Robert F. McGowan. It was the 49th Our Gang short subject released.

Cast
 Joe Cobb as Joe
 Jackie Condon as Jackie
 Mickey Daniels as Mickey
 Johnny Downs as Johnny
 Allen Hoskins as Farina
 Mary Kornman as Mary
 Pal the Dog as himself

Additional cast
 Gabe Saienz as Tough kid
 Bobby Young as Kid fighting Joe
 Ed Brandenburg as Bellboy
 Harry Earles as The midget
 William Gillespie as William Weedle
 Helen Gilmore as Joe's mother
 Charlie Hall as Bellboy
 Fay Holderness as Midget's guardian
 Charlotte Mineau as Mrs. Weedle
 William Orlamond as Rich uncle
 Lee Phelps as man listening to Irish joke
 Tiny Sandford as House detective
 Rolfe Sedan as man telling Irish joke
 Martha Sleeper as Leggy lady

References

External links

1926 films
1926 comedy films
1926 short films
American silent short films
American black-and-white films
Films directed by Robert F. McGowan
Hal Roach Studios short films
Our Gang films
1920s American films
Silent American comedy films